The anthem of the Estonian SSR was the Soviet regional anthem of the Estonian SSR between 1945 and 1990 when Estonia was occupied by the Soviet Union.

Background
The anthem was presented to the central government of the USSR in May 1944, three months after the Presidium of the Supreme Soviet of the USSR had issued a decree on 3 February 1944, "On the State Anthems of the Soviet Republics."

The melody of the anthem was composed by Gustav Ernesaks, and the lyrics written by Johannes Semper. The anthems of the Estonian SSR, the Karelo-Finnish SSR, and the Georgian SSR were the only Soviet regional anthems not to mention the Russian people. After the Soviet dictator Joseph Stalin died in 1953, during the following period of "de-Stalinization" in the USSR, on 21 July 1956, the third stanza of the lyrics of the Estonian SSR anthem were changed to remove all mentions of Stalin.

During the Soviet occupation of Estonia performing or reciting the melody or lyrics of the anthem of Estonia Mu isamaa, mu õnn ja rõõm was forbidden by law, and considered a punishable criminal offence by the Soviet regime. While another song with Ernesaks' melody Mu isamaa on minu arm, served as means of expressing national feelings, and was widely regarded by Estonians as their "unofficial anthem". On 8 May 1990, Mu isamaa, mu õnn ja rõõm was restored as the state anthem, together with the blue-black-white Estonian flag and state official name Republic of Estonia.

Lyrics

Notes

References

External links
 Instrumental recording in MP3 format (Full version)
 Instrumental recording in MP3 format (Short version)
 Estonian SSR Anthem 1945(Eesti NSV Hümn)
 MIDI file
 Vocal recording in MP3 format
 Lyrics - nationalanthems.info

Estonian SSR
Estonian songs
Estonian Soviet Socialist Republic